Sun Valley is a barangay of Parañaque, Metro Manila, Philippines.

Geography
Sun Valley is bordered by the barangays of Mervillle to the north, Don Bosco to the south, and San Martín de Porres to the east. The South Luzon Expressway and West Service Road mark Sun Valley's eastern boundary. It is part of the 2nd legislative district of Parañaque.

History 
Formerly part of Barangay La Huerta that included Sun Valley, Marimar, Monte Villa de Monsod, Santa Ana, and Continental Village Subdivision, Sun Valley was made an independent barangay by President Ferdinand Marcos through Presidential Decree No. 1326 dated April 3, 1978.

Demographics 
Sun Valley is considered to be the third densest of 16 barangays in Parañaque, Philippines, with a land area of 177.75 hectares and an estimated population of 38,668 as of 2010, Sun Valley has a population density of 217.54 pop/ha

Brgy. Sun Valley is made up of 16 subdivisions and 17 neighborhoods with an uneven spread of households across them. The estimated number of households in 2013 was just under 8,000.

The 16 subdivisions in order of number of households are:

References 

Parañaque
Barangays of Metro Manila